Kalynove is an urban-type settlement in Alchevsk Raion (district) in Luhansk Oblast of eastern Ukraine, at about 62 km WSW from the centre of Luhansk city. Population: 

The settlement was taken under control of pro-Russian forces during the War in Donbass, that started in 2014.

Demographics
In 2001 the settlement had 3862 inhabitants, native language distribution as of the Ukrainian Census of 2001:
Ukrainian: 80.99%
 Russian: 18.49%
 other languages: 0.52%

References

Urban-type settlements in Alchevsk Raion
Bakhmutsky Uyezd